The Arroyo Simi (Spanish for "Small Stream of Simi", sometimes also referred to as Simi Creek) is a  westwards-running creek, located in California, United States, running from the city of Simi Valley and crosses the valley from east to west, before entering the city of Moorpark. It originates at Corriganville Park by the Santa Susana Pass, and streams westwards into Moorpark where it merges with Arroyo Las Posas by Hitch Road. It extends for  through the Simi Valley, and leaves the city limits by Oak Park at the western end Simi Valley, and continues for seven miles in Moorpark. It is a tributary to the Calleguas Creek, which enters the Pacific Ocean by its estuary at Mugu Lagoon by Naval Air Station Point Mugu. Besides an arroyo, it has been described as a channel, waterway, river, drain, wash, and stream.   Arroyo Simi drains an area of 343 square miles in southern Ventura County. In its natural state, it is an ephemeral creek, which is only seasonally filled during winter time and periods of heavy rain. Today it is for the most part a concrete lined water drain that flows year round. Tributaries to the Arroyo Simi includes Alamos  Canyon-, Sycamore-, Dry Canyon-, Tapo Canyon-, Las Llajas Canyon-, White Oak-, Runkle Canyon-,  and Bus Canyon Creeks, as well as the Erringer Road- and North Simi Drains.

Arroyo Simi Greenway is an ongoing construction project by the City of Simi Valley in order to increase the recreational use of its river parkways. The project includes new paved hiking- and biking trails along the Arroyo Simi, exhibit signs, sixteen new trail entries, and more. The area is administrated as the Arroyo Simi Bike Path by the Rancho Simi Recreation and Park District (RSRPD). It is home to native flora, fish, and avifauna. It is home to fish species such as the brown bullhead, green sunfish, bluntnose minnow, and mosquitofish. It is an important habitat for various species of freshwater-nesting birds in the Simi Valley. Some of the species include the great blue heron, white-faced ibis, black-crowned night heron, green heron, black-necked stilt, great egret, snowy egret, belted kingfisher, black phoebe, killdeer, common yellowthroat, greater yellowlegs, American coot, and mallard.

References

Rivers of Ventura County, California
Geography of Simi Valley, California
Moorpark, California
Santa Susana Mountains
Simi Hills
Washes of California
Rivers of Southern California